Ira Nathaniel Smith (born December 14, 1974) is an American drummer, songwriter, producer, and three-time Grammy nominee.

Life and career 
Smith was born in Chesapeake, Virginia, and started playing drums at age 11, initially influenced by rock and funk music. At 16, he developed an interest in jazz after listening to Album of the Year by Art Blakey and the Jazz Messengers. Smith studied media art and design at James Madison University. While at James Madison, he performed at the Conference of the International Association for Jazz Education in Atlanta, where he met Betty Carter, who invited him to joint performances at the Blue Note in New York City. Smith went to graduate school at Virginia Commonwealth University, where he met Dave Holland and joined Holland's quintet in 2003. Smith appears on the albums Critical Mass (2005) and Pathways (2009). In 2017, he released his first album as leader, Kinfolk: Postcards from Everywhere on Ropeadope Records. In 2018 Smith cowrote and performed in the self-titled, debut EP release from the Vulfpeck spin-off group 'The Fearless Flyers', later going on a US tour with the group and releasing a second such EP in 2019.

Smith has composed soundtracks for broadcast documentaries on Discovery Channel and The Learning Channel. He co-wrote and produced the Michael Jackson song "Heaven Can Wait".

Discography

As leader
 Workday, Waterbaby Music Vol. 1 (Waterbaby Music, 2008) 
 Kinfolk: Postcards from Everywhere (Ropeadope, 2017)
 Pocket Change (Waterbaby Music, 2018)
 Light and Shadow (Waterbaby Music, 2020)
 Kinfolk 2: See the Birds (Edition Records, 2021)

As sideman
With Robin Eubanks
 Klassik Rock Vol. 1 (ArtistShare, 2014)
 More Than Meets the Ear (ArtistShare, 2015)

With Dave Holland
 Critical Mass (Dare2, 2006)
 Pathways (Dare2, 2010)

With Jose James
 Love in a Time of Madness (Blue Note, 2017)
 Lean on Me (Blue Note, 2018)

With Chris Potter
 Underground (Sunnyside, 2006)
 Follow the Red Line (Sunnyside, 2007)
 Ultrahang (ArtistShare, 2009)
 Imaginary Cities (ECM, 2015)

With others
 Patricia Barber, The Cole Porter Mix (Blue Note, 2008)
 Randy Brecker, Randy Pop! (Piloo, 2015)
 Scott Colley, Seven (ArtistShare, 2017)
 Nir Felder, Golden Age (Okeh, 2014)
 Takuya Kuroda, Rising Son (Blue Note, 2014)
 Monday Michiru, Don't Disturb This Groove (Grand Gallery, 2011)
 Eric Roberson, Fire (Blue Erro Soul, 2017)
 Adam Rogers, Dice (Adraj, 2017) 
 Karel Ruzicka, Grace & Gratitude (Animal Music, 2018)
 Paul Simon, In the Blue Light (Legacy 2018)
 Alex Sipiagin, Live at Smalls (Smalls, 2013)
 Somi, Petite Afrique (Okeh, 2017)
The Fearless Flyers, The Fearless Flyers (Vulf Records 2018), The Fearless Flyers II (Vulf Records 2019), Tailwinds (Vulf Records, 2020), The Fearless Flyers III (Vulf Records, 2022)
 Brittany Howard, Jaime (ATO Records 2019)

Equipment 
Nate endorses Zildjian cymbals, Ludwig drums, Vic firths sticks/mallets/beaters, and Evans drumheads.

References

External links 
 Nate Smith – WWVT-FM interview (2017)

1974 births
Living people
21st-century American drummers
African-American drummers
American session musicians
Musicians from Virginia
21st-century African-American musicians
20th-century African-American people